Silt is the debut album by Mistle Thrush, a Boston, Massachusetts-based band. It was released in 1995 on CD by Bedazzled (catalog #BDZ26). The previous year, the band released a five-song EP titled Agus Amàrach. The band didn't release another full-length album until 1997's Super Refraction. Silt saw original guitarist Brad Rigney (departed to Big Monster Fish Hook) replaced by former teenage hardcore semi-star, Matthew Kattman (ex-Funny Wagon/Kingpin).

Track listing
All tracks written by Mistle Thrush, except where noted.
"Freshwater" – 2:14
"Flowereyed" – 4:20
"One Sixth" – :42
"Cicada" – 5:51 (Todd Demma, Valerie Forgione, Matthew Kattman, Ruben Layman, Scott Patalano, Brad Rigney)
"Overpass" – 4:20
"Some Poet" – 5:02
"Wake Up (The Sleep Song)" – 5:59
"Silt" – 1:04
"Red Caboose" – 4:01
"Shine Away" – 6:20
"The Sky and My Hands" – 5:22 (Demma, Forgione, Kattman, Layman, Patalano, Rigney)
"The Honey Trip" – 9:26
"Bloom" – 3:20

Personnel

Mistle Thrush
Todd Demma – Drums, percussion
Valerie Forgione – Vocals, acoustic guitar, xylophone, drums ("The Sky and My Hands")
Matthew Kattman – Electric and acoustic guitar, bass guitar ("The Sky and My Hands")
Ruben Layman – Bass guitar
Scott Patalano – Electric and acoustic guitar, drums ("The Sky and My Hands")

Additional musicians
Mark White – Double bass ("Overpass")

Production
Y. Mike – Producer, mixing
Mistle Thrush – Producer, mixing
Jon Williams – Assistant engineer
Dan McLaughlin – Assistant engineer
David Lefkowitz – Assistant engineer
Marc LaFleur – Assistant engineer
Mike Sielewicz – Engineer

Additional credits
Recorded at Fort Apache, Cambridge, Massachusetts and The Studio
Mixed at Prophet Sound and The Studio
Mastered at M Works
Rebecca Fagan – Design
Matthew Kattman – Illustration
Petrina Katsikas – Manager

Sources
CD liner notes

1995 albums
Mistle Thrush (band) albums